DFO may refer to:

Businesses and organizations 
 Dairy Farmers of Ontario, Canada
 Department of Fisheries and Oceans, Canada
 Direct Factory Outlet, Australia
 German Women's Order (Deutscher Frauenorden or DFO), merged into the National Socialist Women's League

Science 
 1,8-Diazafluoren-9-one, a chemical that reveals fingerprints
 Deferoxamine, medication for iron overdose
 Dispersive flies optimisation, a swarm intelligence algorithm

Other uses 
 Dungeon Fighter Online, a 2009 computer game